Putnikovo is a village in Serbia. It is situated in the Kovačica municipality, in the South Banat District, Vojvodina province. The village has a Serb ethnic majority (97.53%) and its population numbering 243 people (2002 census).

Historical population

1961: 436
1971: 375
1981: 307
1991: 260

See also
List of places in Serbia
List of cities, towns and villages in Vojvodina

References
Slobodan Ćurčić, Broj stanovnika Vojvodine, Novi Sad, 1996.

External links
 https://web.archive.org/web/20061007215659/http://www.putnikovo.org.yu/

Populated places in Serbian Banat
Populated places in South Banat District
Kovačica